Bohobli is a village in the far west of Ivory Coast. It is in the sub-prefecture of Méo, Toulépleu Department, Cavally Region, Montagnes District. The village is five kilometres east of the border with Liberia.

Bohobli was a commune until March 2012, when it became one of 1126 communes nationwide that were abolished.

Notes

Former communes of Ivory Coast
Populated places in Montagnes District
Populated places in Cavally Region